The China women's national football team (recognized as China PR by FIFA) represents the People's Republic of China in international women's football competitions and is governed by the Chinese Football Association. China women's team won silver medals at the 1996 Summer Olympics and the 1999 FIFA Women's World Cup. It also has won 9 titles at Asian Cup and 3 Gold medals at Asian Games.

Team image

Nicknames
The China women's national football team has been known or nicknamed as "铿锵玫瑰 (Steel Roses)".

FIFA World Ranking
, after the match against .

 Best Ranking   Best Mover   Worst Ranking   Worst Mover

Results and fixtures

The following is a list of match results in the last 12 months, as well as any future matches that have been scheduled.

Legend

2022

2023

Official Results
China Fixtures and Results – Soccerway.com

Coaching staff

Current coaching staff

Manager history

  Cong Zheyu (1986–1988)
  Shang Ruihua (1988–1991)
  Ma Yuanan (1991–2001)
  Ma Liangxing (2002–2003)
  Zhang Haitao (2003–2004)
  Wang Haiming (2004–2005)
  Pei Encai (2005)
  Ma Liangxing (2005–2006)
  Wang Haiming (caretaker) (2007)
  Marika Domanski-Lyfors (2007)
  Élisabeth Loisel (2007–2008)
  Shang Ruihua (2008–2010)
  Li Xiaopeng (2011–2012)
  Hao Wei (2012–2015)
  Bruno Bini (2015–2017)
  Sigurður Ragnar Eyjólfsson (2017–2018)
  Jia Xiuquan (2018–2021)
  Shui Qingxia (2021–)

Players

Current squad
The following players were called up for the 2022 AFC Women's Asian Cup.
Caps and goals are correct as of 23 January 2022 after the match against Iran.

Records

Most capped players

, the ten players with the most appearances for China are:

Top goalscorers

the five highest goalscorers for China are:

Competitive record
 Champions   Runners-up   Third place   Fourth place

FIFA Women's World Cup

Olympic Games

AFC Women's Asian Cup

Asian Games

Minor tournaments

EAFF E-1 Football Championship

Algarve Cup
The Algarve Cup is an invitational tournament for national teams in women's association football hosted by the Portuguese Football Federation (FPF). Held annually in the Algarve region of Portugal since 1994, it is one of the most prestigious and longest-running women's international football events and has been nicknamed the "Mini FIFA Women's World Cup".

Four Nations Tournament

Yongchuan International Tournament

Head-to-head record

, after the match against .

 counted for the FIFA A-level matches only.

Honours

Intercontinental
 FIFA Women's World Cup
  Runners-up: 1999
 Olympic Games
  Runners-up: 1996

Continental
 AFC Women's Asian Cup
 Winners: 1986, 1989, 1991, 1993, 1995, 1997, 1999, 2006, 2022
 Runners-up: 2003, 2008
 Asian Games
 Winners: 1990, 1994, 1998
 Runners-up: 2002, 2018

Regional
 EAFF Women's Football Championship
  Runners-up: 2010, 2022

Other tournaments
 Albena Cup
 Winners: 1990
 Algarve Cup
 Winners: 1999, 2002
 Runners-up: 1997, 2003
 Four Nations Tournament
 Winners: 2005, 2009, 2014, 2016, 2017, 2018, 2019
 Yongchuan International Tournament
 Winners: 2015, 2016, 2018, 2019

See also
 Sport in China
 Football in China
 Women's football in China
 Chinese Football Association (CFA)
 China women's national football team
 China women's national football team results and fixtures
 List of China women's international footballers
 China women's national under-20 football team
 China women's national under-17 football team
 China women's national futsal team

References

External links
China women's national football team – official website
China women's national football team – official website (last updated in 2019) at thecfa.cn 
FIFA profile at fifa.com 

 
Asian women's national association football teams